Valters Āboliņš (born 19 December 1985 in Dobele, Latvia) is a Latvian rogaining competitor and former football defender. He won a silver medal in the XO group at the 8th World Rogaining Championship in Karula National Park, Estonia. His teammates were Andris Ansabergs and Mara Leitane. He also spend two years in Latvia Second league football club Hemat.

References

External links
 
 

1985 births
Living people
People from Dobele
Male orienteers
Latvian orienteers
Latvian footballers
Association footballers not categorized by position